Pet Your Friends is the debut album by American alternative rock band Dishwalla. It was released in 1995 on A&M Records. The album produced the hit single "Counting Blue Cars" (the second single off the album), which was a Top 40 favorite. The album's fourth single, "Charlie Brown's Parents", was popular at concerts, although it was not a very successful single in terms of sales. An acoustic version of "Counting Blue Cars" which featured an extended bridge was also popular on radio.

The image used for the cover of the album is taken from the August 23, 1948 Life Magazine cover. The cover story talks about a seventeen-year-old girl who became friends with a friend's pet deer while swimming one day.

Track listing

Personnel
Dishwalla
 J.R. Richards – lead vocals, keyboards, piano, organ, Hammond Organ, Roland Juno 60
 Rodney Browning – guitar, backing vocals
 Scot Alexander – bass, backing vocals, tabla, bells, Roland Juno 60
 George Pendergast – drums, percussion, backing vocals

Additional personnel
Ian Cross - Asst Engineer
Andy Kravitz - Programming, Additional Production, Engineer
Bob Ludwig - Mastering
Phil Nicolo - Programming, Producer, Engineer, Mixing
David Young - Executive Producer
Dishwalla - Programming, Producer
Eric Flickinger - Assistant Engineer
Michael Lavine - Photography
Dirk Grobelny - Engineer
Mark Mazzetti - Executive Producer, A&R
Sunja Park - Art Direction
Tulio Torrinello, Jr. - Assistant Engineer
Jone Pedersen - Cover Model
Jon Brenneis - Photography

Chart positions

Singles

Certifications

References

1995 debut albums
Dishwalla albums
A&M Records albums